Spiritus intus alit is:

a Latin phrase (from Virgil) meaning the spirit nourishes within and is found at (Aeneid, VI, 726).

It is also the motto of:
Clifton College
Inverurie Academy in Inverurie, Scotland.
Sojourners Masonic Lodge No. 7597, based in Hampshire. 

It is also:
 A piece of music composed in 2002 for Baritone and Live Processing Sounds by the composer Ching-Wen Chao
 A piece of religious music by Ferguson and is used in the church calendar at Pentecost and confirmation

Latin mottos